Phebalium brachycalyx is a species of shrub that is endemic to the southwest of Western Australia. It is more or less covered with silvery and rust-coloured scales, and has narrow oblong leaves  with wavy-glandular edges, and white to pale yellow flowers in umbels on the ends of branches.

Description
The edge of the leaves are wavy-glandular and the mid-vein on the lower surface is warty. Flowering occurs from August to November.

Taxonomy and naming
Phebalium brachycalyx was first formally described in 1998 by Paul Wilson in the journal Nuytsia from specimens collected at the south end of the Wongan Hills by Alex George.

Distribution and habitat
Phebalium brachycalyx grows on laterite on hills between Dalwallinu and Kondinin.

Conservation status
Phebalium brachycalyx is classified as "Priority Three" by the Government of Western Australia Department of Parks and Wildlife meaning that it is poorly known and known from only a few locations but is not under imminent threat.

References

brachycalyx
Flora of Western Australia
Plants described in 1970
Taxa named by Paul G. Wilson